

Siegfried Carl Theodor Westphal (18 March 1902 – 2 July 1982) was a German general in the Wehrmacht during World War II. He served as operations officer under Rommel and chief of staff under Kesselring and Rundstedt. He was a recipient of the Knight's Cross of the Iron Cross of Nazi Germany.

Westphal surrendered to the American troops in May 1945 and acted as a witness at the Nuremberg Trials. He was released in 1947. He wrote a book titled The German Army in the West, which was published in 1952. He appears in a number of interview segments of The World at War.

Awards and decorations

 Knight's Cross of the Iron Cross on 29 November 1942 as Oberst i.G. and Chef des Generalstabes of Deutsch-Italienische Panzerarmee

References

Citations

Bibliography

 

1902 births
1982 deaths
German Army officers of World War II
Generals of Cavalry (Wehrmacht)
Reichswehr personnel
Recipients of the Gold German Cross
Recipients of the Knight's Cross of the Iron Cross
German prisoners of war in World War II held by the United States
Military personnel from Leipzig
People from the Kingdom of Saxony
Knights Commander of the Order of Merit of the Federal Republic of Germany